The third season of the American television sitcom New Girl premiered on Fox on September 17, 2013, and concluded on May 6, 2014. Season three consists of 23 episodes. Developed by Elizabeth Meriwether under the working title Chicks & Dicks, the series revolves around offbeat teacher Jess (Zooey Deschanel) after her moving into a Los Angeles loft with three men, Nick (Jake Johnson), Schmidt (Max Greenfield), and Winston (Lamorne Morris); Jess's best friend Cece (Hannah Simone) also appears regularly. The show combines comedy and drama elements as the characters, who are in their early thirties, deal with maturing relationships and career choices.

Production
In March 2013, Fox renewed New Girl for a third season. It premiered on September 17, 2013.

On May 13, 2013, Fox reported that an episode of this season will air after Super Bowl XLVIII, said episode aired along with Brooklyn Nine-Nine, which aired after it. Prince guest starred in the Super Bowl episode, "Prince", marking his first time guest starring in a television sitcom.

Initially scheduled to appear in at least four episodes, Damon Wayans Jr. returned to the show as Coach in the seventh episode and stayed for the remainder of the season as a "special guest star".

Taye Diggs guest starred in Wayans, Jr.'s returning episode, as a ladies' man who hits on Jess. Eva Amurri returned to guest star for one episode. Angela Kinsey guest starred as Rose, a teacher at Jess' new job, who clashes with Jess over her personality and work ethic. Dreama Walker also guest starred in Kinsey's introductory episode, as a teacher named Molly, who immediately takes a dislike to Jess. Jamie Lee Curtis and Rob Reiner returned as Jess' parents in the episode "Birthday". Ben Falcone also guest starred in "Birthday", and Jessica Chaffin first appeared in the episode "Longest Night Ever". Adam Brody appeared as Jess' ex-boyfriend Berkley in the episode "Exes". Linda Cardellini appeared in a three-episode arc as Jess' sister Abby, with her first episode entitled "Sister". Alexandra Daddario guest starred as Michelle, a woman to moves into the apartment building where Jess and the guys live.

Cast and characters

Main cast
 Zooey Deschanel as Jessica "Jess" Day
 Jake Johnson as Nick Miller
 Max Greenfield as Schmidt
 Lamorne Morris as Winston Bishop
 Hannah Simone as Cece

Special guest cast
Prince as Himself

Recurring cast
Damon Wayans Jr. as Coach
Rob Reiner as Bob Day
Brenda Song as Daisy
Merritt Wever as Elizabeth
Curtis Armstrong as Principal Foster
Angela Kinsey as Rose
Steve Agee as Outside Dave
Jessica Chaffin as Bertie
Brian Posehn as Biology Teacher
Jamie Lee Curtis as Joan
Linda Cardellini as Abby Day
Jon Lovitz as Rabbi Feiglin
Ben Falcone as Mike
June Diane Raphael as Sadie
James Frecheville as Buster

Guest cast

Episodes

References

External links

 
 

New Girl
2013 American television seasons
2014 American television seasons